Yvonne Brage (born 8 July 1951) is a Swedish former breaststroke swimmer. She competed in two events at the 1968 Summer Olympics.

References

External links
 

1951 births
Living people
Swedish female breaststroke swimmers
Olympic swimmers of Sweden
Swimmers at the 1968 Summer Olympics
People from Skövde Municipality
Sportspeople from Västra Götaland County